Duirinish or Diùirinis can refer to several places in Scotland:
Duirinish, Skye - a peninsula on the island of Skye
Duirinish, Lochalsh - a settlement in Lochalsh
Duirinish railway station - a station at this settlement